The Toyota Camry Solara, popularly known as the Toyota Solara, is a mid-size coupé/convertible built by Toyota. The Camry Solara is mechanically based on the Toyota Camry and effectively replaced the discontinued Camry Coupé (XV10); however, in contrast with its predecessor's conservative design, the Camry Solara was designed with a greater emphasis on sportiness, with more rakish styling, and uprated suspension and engine tuning intended to provide a sportier feel. The coupe was launched in late 1998 for model year 1999. In 2000, the convertible was introduced, effectively replacing the Celica convertible in Toyota's North American lineup.

The second-generation Camry Solara debuted in 2003 for model year 2004, initially offered as a coupe; the second-generation convertible was introduced in the spring of 2004 as a 2005 model. Coupe production ended in mid-2008. Despite official statements that the convertible might be sold until 2010 if demand was sufficient, production was suspended in December 2008 and never resumed.



First generation (XV20; 1998–2003) 

Created to appeal to a demographic of more sport-minded drivers than those who prefer the Toyota Camry sedan, the Camry Solara aspired to blend "sporty" looks and style with spacious practicality. Prior to the production of the Camry Solara, the 2-door version of the Toyota Camry was simply known as the Camry Coupe. It was added to the third generation Camry lineup in 1993 for model year 1994 to compete with the Honda Accord and other cars in its class. However, due to it never being nearly as popular as the 4-door sedan of the Camry, the Camry Coupe was dropped in 1996 when the sedan was redesigned for model year 1997. A distinct successor went into development in the mid-1990s, resulting a winning design entry in 1995 from Warren J. Crain of Calty Design and Research. After design approval, production development ran from 1995 to the first half of 1998. Patents were filed at the Japan Patent Office on January 18, 1996, under 1020408 and November 14, 1996, at the United States Patent Office USPTO under D407350.

The first generation Camry Solara went on sale in the third quarter of 1998 as a 1999 model to replace the Camry Coupe. It was based on the mechanical platform of the previous generation Toyota Camry and was built at the TMMC facilities in Cambridge, Ontario, Canada.

The Toyota Camry Solara is also the first vehicle in the Toyota lineup, after their 1997 partnership agreement to feature a JBL premium stereo option, which all models came with a single-slot in-dash CD player and cassette deck. The SE models come standard with 15-inch steel wheels and hubcaps, upgradable to 15-inch alloy wheels. The Sports Package also adds a retuned suspension, perforated leather-wrapped steering wheel, perforated eight-way power-adjustable leather seats, an upgrade to 16-inch alloy wheels, retuned steering, minor trim changes and a rear lip spoiler.

In 2000, the SE and SLE convertibles were added to the lineup; these cars were built as semi-finished coupes, shipped to an American Sunroof Company (ASC) facility where the roofs were removed and convertible tops installed, and were then shipped back to Toyota for painting and final assembly. Claiming that the car's basic structure was designed for this treatment, Toyota made no suspension or structural changes from the coupe.

Minor model update (2001–2003) 

The Camry Solara was facelifted in September 2001 for the 2002 model year, receiving changes to the grille pattern, taillights, headlights that now featured a 4-bulb system instead of 2, a chrome logo on the steering wheel (instead of an embossed pattern), and smaller fog lights. The trunk was now openable by remote and the wood trim changed from Oxford Burlwood to Mustard Wood. New packages and options were also offered and include heated leather seats, an Appearance Package that featured a 3-spoke steering wheel, leather-wrapped shift knob, black pearl emblems, and a different center cap on the wheels.

Mechanically, the 2.2-liter four-cylinder engine was replaced with the same 2.4-liter four-cylinder engine offered on the redesigned 2002 Camry, the 2AZ-FE. This new engine was chosen because it featured the same gas mileage as the previous engine, except it offered more power and the addition of VVT-i, a technology that improved performance and reduced emissions.

Second generation (XV30; 2003–2008) 

The second generation of the Camry Solara was completely redesigned (design approval in 2001; JPO patent number 1218292) and introduced to the public in August 2003 for the 2004 model year and featured a curvier body, with the option of adding XM radio and/or a navigation system. Based on the platform of the 2002 Camry sedan, the Gen 2 body is heavier than the Gen 1.5 body. The four-cylinder engine could be coupled to a five-speed manual or four-speed automatic transmission, while the V6 was offered only with a five-speed U151E automatic transmission. Both engines featured Toyota's VVT-i technology.

The Solara moved to Toyota Motor Manufacturing Kentucky for the second generation model. Production started in July 2003 for the coupe and February 2004 for the convertible. The convertible was offered only with the 3.3 liter V-6 and the 5-speed MMT automatic transmission. Rather than being adapted from the coupe like the first-generation car—which had been criticized for poor structural rigidity—Toyota claimed that the second-generation convertible was specifically designed and built as such, with a more rigid body structure for decreased levels of noise and vibration.

In late 2005 for the 2006 model year, the five-speed MMT automatic transmission replaced the four-speed automatic on four-cylinder models, and minor changes were made to the optional power driver's seat.

In June 2006, a restyled 2007 Solara was introduced, with new LED tail lights, a revised rear bumper, and a redesigned front fascia. Interior changes include Optitron gauges, blue backlighting in the rest of the car's controls, a new steering wheel design that is somewhat similar to the recently revised Camry SE's steering wheel, revised shifter, MP3 and WMA CD playback capability, external audio device (e.g. iPod, Zen, cassette) auxiliary port connectivity, Bluetooth connectivity, and voice-activated navigation on the SLE V6 models.

The second-generation Solara sold below expectations, as it inherited the unexciting handling from its Camry parent. Despite the structural redesign, the convertible was still criticized for soft handling that did not feel sporty, and for significant body shake.  From model year 2005 to 2008, sales fell from roughly 50,000 units annually to just over 20,000. After the 2008 model year, the coupe was discontinued due to faltering sales, but the convertible, which accounted for the majority of units sold, continued to be produced.

Despite statements that the convertible might be sold until at least 2010, production was quietly suspended in December 2008, with sales continuing from inventory to gauge demand. In June 2009, Toyota announced that sales had not met expectations, and that production would not resume.

Use of model name 
The name Solara was previously used on a motor vehicle by Peugeot, with their Talbot Solara, a notchback variant of the Chrysler Alpine hatchback developed by Chrysler Europe before their takeover by Peugeot in 1978. The rights to use the Solara name on a motor vehicle within Europe remain with Peugeot. From time to time, such names from the past appear on limited edition models. Mitsubishi Australia also used this name on the mid-spec versions of its Mitsubishi Magna sedan and station wagon.

References

External links 

 

Camry Solara
Coupés
Front-wheel-drive vehicles
Mid-size cars
Convertibles
Motor vehicles manufactured in the United States
Cars introduced in 1998
2000s cars